This article lists the results for the New Zealand national football team from 2020 to present.

New Zealand had been scheduled to play Oman and Bahrain in March 2020 however, the matches were cancelled due to the COVID-19 pandemic. Further matches against Belgium in October 2020 and England in November 2020 were also cancelled due to player availability as a result of the coronavirus pandemic.

Key

Key to matches
Att. = Match attendance
(H) = Home ground
(A) = Away ground
(N) = Neutral ground

Key to record by opponent
Pld = Games played
W = Games won
D = Games drawn
L = Games lost
GF = Goals for
GA = Goals against

A-International results
New Zealand's score is shown first in each case.

Notes

Streaks
Most wins in a row
5, 18 March 2022 – 30 March 2022
Most matches without a loss
5, 18 March 2022 – 30 March 2022
Most draws in a row
1, 9 June 2022 – 9 June 2022
Most losses in a row
3, 14 June 2022 – 25 September 2022
Most matches without a win
5, 5 June 2022 – 25 September 2022

Record by opponent

See also
New Zealand national football team
New Zealand at the FIFA World Cup
New Zealand at the FIFA Confederations Cup
New Zealand at the OFC Nations Cup

References

2020–39